In mathematics, specifically algebraic topology, an Eilenberg–MacLane space is a topological space with a single nontrivial homotopy group.

Let G be a group and n a positive integer. A connected topological space X is called an Eilenberg–MacLane space of type , if it has n-th homotopy group  isomorphic to G and all other homotopy groups trivial.  If  then G must be abelian. Such a space exists, is a CW-complex, and is unique up to a weak homotopy equivalence, therefore any such space is often just called . 

The name is derived from Samuel Eilenberg and Saunders Mac Lane, who introduced such spaces in the late 1940s.

As such, an Eilenberg–MacLane space is a special kind of topological space that in homotopy theory can be regarded as a building block for CW-complexes via  fibrations in a Postnikov system. These spaces are important in many contexts in algebraic topology, including computations of homotopy groups of spheres, definition of cohomology operations, and for having a strong connection to  singular cohomology.

A generalised Eilenberg–Maclane space is a space which has the homotopy type of a product of Eilenberg–Maclane spaces
.

Examples
 The complement to any connected knot or graph in a 3-dimensional sphere  is of type ; this is called the "asphericity of knots", and is a 1957 theorem of Christos Papakyriakopoulos.
This can be shown using covering space theory and the fact that the infinite dimensional sphere is contractible.

Remark on constructing Eilenberg–MacLane spaces
Note that if G has a torsion element, then every CW-complex of type K(G,1) has to be infinite-dimensional.

There are multiple techniques for constructing higher Eilenberg-Maclane spaces. Note that the lower homotopy groups  are already trivial by construction.

Another useful technique is to use the geometric realization of simplicial abelian groups. This gives an explicit presentation of simplicial abelian groups which represent Eilenberg-Maclane spaces.

Another simplicial construction, in terms of classifying spaces and universal bundles, is given in J. Peter May's book.

Since taking the loop space lowers the homotopy groups by one slot, we have a canonical homotopy equivalence , hence there is a fibration sequence
.

This was exploited by Jean-Pierre Serre while he studied the homotopy groups of spheres using the Postnikov system and spectral sequences.

Properties of Eilenberg–MacLane spaces

Bijection between homotopy classes of maps and cohomology

there is a distinguished element  corresponding to the identity. The above bijection is given by the pullback of that element . This is similar to the Yoneda lemma of category theory.

A constructive proof of this theorem can be found here, another making use of the relation between omega-spectra and generalized reduced cohomology theories can be found here  and the main idea is sketched later as well.

Loop spaces / Omega spectra 
The loop space of an Eilenberg–MacLane space is again an Eilenberg–MacLane space: . Further there is an adjoint relation between the loop-space and the reduced suspension: , which gives  the structure of an abelian group, where the operation is the concatenation of loops. This makes the bijection  mentioned above a group isomorphism.

Also this property implies that Eilenberg–MacLane spaces with various n form an omega-spectrum, called an "Eilenberg–MacLane spectrum". Therefore these two cohomology theories coincide.

In a more general context, Brown representability says that every reduced cohomology theory on based CW-complexes comes from an omega-spectrum.

Relation with Homology
For a fixed abelian group  there are maps on the  stable homotopy groups 

induced by the map . Taking the direct limit over these maps, one can verify that this defines a reduced homology theory 

on CW complexes.

Functoriality 
It follows from the universal coefficient theorem for cohomology that the Eilenberg MacLane space is a quasi-functor of the group; that is, for each positive integer  if  is any homomorphism of abelian groups, then there is a non-empty set

 

satisfying 
where  denotes the homotopy class of a continuous map  and

Relation with Postnikov/Whitehead tower 
Every connected CW-complex   possesses a Postnikov tower, that is an inverse system of spaces:

such that for every :
the maps  are fibrations with fiber .

Dually there exists a Whitehead tower, which is a sequence of CW-complexes: 

such that for every : 
  is  n-connected,
 the maps  are fibrations with fiber 

With help of  Serre spectral sequences computations of higher homotopy groups of spheres can be made. For instance  and  using a Whitehead tower of  can be found here, more generally those of  using a Postnikov systems can be found here.

Cohomology operations 

As a result, cohomology operations cannot decrease the degree of the cohomology groups and degree preserving cohomology operations are corresponding
to coefficient homomorphism .

Some interesting examples for cohomology operations are Steenrod Squares and Powers, when  are finite cyclic groups.

Group (co)homology 
One can define the group (co)homology of G with coefficients in the group A as the singular (co)homology of the Eilenberg-MacLane space  with coefficients in A.

Further Applications 
The loop space construction described above is used in string theory to obtain, for example, the string group, the fivebrane group and so on, as the Whitehead tower arising from the short exact sequence

with  the string group, and  the spin group. The relevance of  lies in the fact that there are the homotopy equivalences

for the classifying space , and the fact . Notice that because the complex spin group is a group extension
,
the String group can be thought of as a "higher" complex spin group extension, in the sense of higher group theory since the space  is an example of a higher group. It can be thought of the topological realization of the groupoid  whose object is a single point and whose morphisms are the group . Because of these homotopical properties, the construction generalizes: any given space  can be used to start a short exact sequence that kills the homotopy group  in a topological group.

See also
Classifying space, for the case 
Brown representability theorem, regarding representation spaces
Moore space, the homology analogue.

Notes

References

Foundational articles

Cartan seminar and applications 
The Cartan seminar contains many fundamental results about Eilenberg-Maclane spaces including their homology and cohomology, and applications for calculating the homotopy groups of spheres.

 http://www.numdam.org/volume/SHC_1954-1955__7/

Computing integral cohomology rings 

 Derived functors of the divided power functors
 Integral Cohomology of Finite Postnikov Towers
 (Co)homology of the Eilenberg-MacLane spaces K(G,n)

Other encyclopedic references 
 Encyclopedia of Mathematics

Homotopy theory